Joachim Werner Ehrig (born 21 February 1947) is a German retired rower who specialized in the coxless fours. He won a silver medal in the event at the 1970 World Rowing Championships and bronze medals at the 1971 European Championships and 1972 Summer Olympics.

References

External links
 

1947 births
Living people
Olympic rowers of West Germany
Rowers at the 1972 Summer Olympics
Olympic bronze medalists for West Germany
Olympic medalists in rowing
West German male rowers
World Rowing Championships medalists for West Germany
Medalists at the 1972 Summer Olympics
European Rowing Championships medalists
Sportspeople from Heidelberg